The Tony Conigliaro Award is a national recognition instituted in 1990 by the Boston Red Sox to honor the memory of Tony Conigliaro. It is given annually to a Major League Baseball (MLB) player who best "overcomes an obstacle and adversity through the attributes of spirit, determination, and courage that were trademarks of Conigliaro."

Conigliaro debuted with the Red Sox in 1964, and was selected to the MLB All-Star Game in the 1967 season. Subsequently, he was hit in the face by a pitch at Fenway Park on August 18, 1967. After missing the rest of the year and all of 1968, he made a comeback in 1969, homering on opening day. He then hit 20 home runs in that season, winning The Sporting News Comeback Player of the Year Award. In 1970, he posted career highs in home runs with 36 and RBIs with 116, but vision problems continued to persist; his performance fell off, and he was never the same player. After a final comeback attempt in 1975, Conigliaro retired at age 30.

Conigliaro died in 1990, and the Red Sox instituted the award in his honor. A panel is composed of the media, representatives of the commissioner, and the two leagues' offices. The selection is made by a panel of voters and the award is presented at the annual dinner of the Boston chapter of the Baseball Writers' Association of America (BBWAA), normally held in December or January, by members of the Conigliaro family.

Award winners

 The award is presented at the annual banquet of the Boston chapter of the BBWAA, which was not held in December 2021.

See also

Baseball awards

References

External links

Boston Red Sox
Major League Baseball trophies and awards
Awards established in 1990